The 2018 Toyota/Save Mart 350 was a Monster Energy NASCAR Cup Series race held on June 24, 2018 at Sonoma Raceway in Sonoma, California. Contested over 110 laps on the  road course, it was the 16th race of the 2018 Monster Energy NASCAR Cup Series season.

Report

Background

Sonoma Raceway, formerly Sears Point Raceway and Infineon Raceway is a  road course and drag strip located on the landform known as Sears Point in the southern Sonoma Mountains in Sonoma, California, USA. It is host to one of only three Monster Energy NASCAR Cup Series races each year that are run on road courses (the others being Watkins Glen International in Watkins Glen, New York and the road course layout for the Bank of America 500 at Charlotte Motor Speedway). It is also host to the Verizon IndyCar Series and several other auto races and motorcycle races such as the American Federation of Motorcyclists series. Sonoma Raceway continues to host amateur, or club racing events which may or may not be open to the general public. The largest such car club is the Sports Car Club of America.

Entry list

Practice

First practice

Final practice

Qualifying

Qualifying results

Race

Stage Results

Stage 1
Laps: 25

Stage 2
Laps: 25

Final Stage Results

Stage 3
Laps: 60

Race statistics
 Lead changes: 7 among different drivers
 Cautions/Laps: 3 for 8
 Red flags: 0
 Time of race: 2 hours, 38 minutes and 28 seconds
 Average speed:

Media

Television
Fox NASCAR televised the race in the United States on FS1 for the fourth consecutive year. Mike Joy was the lap-by-lap announcer, while six-time Sonoma winner Jeff Gordon and Darrell Waltrip were the color commentators. Jamie Little, Regan Smith and Matt Yocum reported from pit lane during the race. This is also Fox Sports' last Cup race for their portion of the season as NBC Sports takes over NASCAR broadcasts for the rest of the season.

Radio 
Radio coverage of the race was broadcast by Performance Racing Network. PRN's broadcast of the race was simulcasted on Sirius XM NASCAR Radio. Doug Rice and Mark Garrow announced the race in the booth while the field was racing on the pit straight. Pat Patterson called the race from a stand outside of turn 2 when the field was racing up turns 2, 3 and 3a. Brad Gillie called the race from a stand outside of turn 7a when the field was racing through turns 4a and 7a. The field came back into the view of the booth in turns 8 and 9. Rob Albright called the race from a billboard outside turn 11 when the field was racing through turns 10 and 11. Heather DeBeaux, Brett McMillan and Jim Noble reported from pit lane during the race.

Standings after the race

Drivers' Championship standings

Manufacturers' Championship standings

Note: Only the first 16 positions are included for the driver standings.
. – Driver has clinched a position in the Monster Energy NASCAR Cup Series playoffs.

References

Toyota Save Mart 350
Toyota Save Mart 350
Toyota Save Mart 350
NASCAR races at Sonoma Raceway